Marlow Bottom is a linear village occupying a valley to the north of Marlow, Buckinghamshire. It is also a civil parish in the Buckinghamshire district having been created in November 2007. Formerly it was part of the parish of Great Marlow.

Marlow Bottom is 25 to 30 minutes walk from the centre of Marlow town, and the river Thames. It has shops, including a newsagent, vet, chemist, dentist, music shop, dog grooming parlour, Italian restaurant and fish & chip shop, a large primary school, (Burford School), a private members club (The Barn Club, for valley residents), a village hall and two small churches (Anglican and Methodist) which form a Local Ecumenical Partnership "The Lantern", where the local Boy Scout and Girl Guide groups and similar voluntary groups meet.  Marlow Bottom is also home to the Rebellion Beer Company, a local brewery producing regular and seasonal beers.

Education
The primary school in Marlow Bottom is Burford County Combined School.  It provides schooling for children aged 4–11, who will go on to either a local grammar school or secondary modern school depending on their results in the eleven-plus exam.

Points of interest
Olympic champion rower Steve Redgrave lives in the village, having been born locally and attended local schools. 
The original fungus from which Quorn was made was found in a field nearby (Quorn is still manufactured by the company Marlow Foods).
Marlow Bottom villagers meet annually in the summer for the Burford Fair, a local celebration and fundraiser. The 'Rose Carnival Queen', is chosen from a selection of pupils at Burford School, who enter a competition to win the title. Sammy Gabb holds the record for the most Rose Queen coronations. 
The award-winning Rebellion Beer Company has brewed ales in the village since 1993.
The annual Rock Bottom Music Festival is held every year in the playing fields which started in 2013.

References

External links

Marlow Bottom Parish Council Website

Villages in Buckinghamshire
Civil parishes in Buckinghamshire